Kieffer Knoll is a rocky knoll which marks the extreme northeast corner of the Queen Elizabeth Range, Antarctica. It was mapped by the United States Geological Survey from tellurometer surveys and Navy air photos, 1960–62, and was named by the Advisory Committee on Antarctic Names for Hugh H. Kieffer, a United States Antarctic Research Program glaciologist at Roosevelt Island, 1961–62.

References

Description:	Rocky knoll which marks the extreme NE corner of the Queen Elizabeth Range. Mapped by the U.S. Geological Survey (USGS) from tellurometer surveys and Navy air photos, 1960–62. Named by Advisory Committee on Antarctic Names (US-ACAN) for Hugh H. Kieffer, U.S. Antarctic Research Program (USARP) glaciologist at Roosevelt Island, 1961–62.

Hills of the Ross Dependency
Shackleton Coast